Kusum Tete is a Bharatiya Janata Party politician from Odisha. She has been elected in Odisha Legislative Assembly election in 2019 from Sundargarh constituency as candidate of Bharatiya Janata Party.

References 

Living people
Bharatiya Janata Party politicians from Odisha
Odisha MLAs 2019–2024
Year of birth missing (living people)
People from Sundergarh district